The 2019 Cameron's Brewing Oakville Fall Classic was held August 30 to September 2 in Oakville, Ontario. It was the first event of the Ontario Curling Tour for the 2019–20 curling season and the sixth and fifth Men's and Women's events on the World Curling Tour respectively. The total purse for the event was $16,000 on both the Men's and Women's side.

In the Men's event, Yannick Schwaller defeated Kim Chang-min 7–3 in the final and in the Women's event, Eve Muirhead defeated Silvana Tirinzoni 5–2 in the final.

Men

Teams

The teams are listed as follows:

Round Robin Standings
Final Round Robin Standings

Round Robin Results
All draw times are listed in Eastern Time (UTC−05:00).

Draw 1
Friday, August 30, 10:30

Draw 2
Friday, August 30, 13:30

Draw 3
Friday, August 30, 16:00

Draw 4
Friday, August 30, 19:00

Draw 5
Friday, August 30, 21:30

Draw 6
Saturday, August 31, 08:00

Draw 7
Saturday, August 31, 10:30

Draw 8
Saturday, August 31, 13:30

Draw 9
Saturday, August 31, 16:00

Draw 10
Saturday, August 31, 19:00

Draw 11
Saturday, August 31, 21:30

Draw 12
Sunday, September 1, 09:00

Draw 13
Sunday, September 1, 12:00

Playoffs

Source:

Qualification Games
Sunday, September 1, 18:00

Quarterfinals
Sunday, September 1, 21:30

Semifinals
Monday, September 2, 09:00

Final
Monday, September 2, 12:30

Women

Teams

The teams are listed as follows:

Round Robin Standings
Final Round Robin Standings

Round Robin Results
All draw times are listed in Eastern Time (UTC−05:00).

Draw 1
Friday, August 30, 10:30

Draw 2
Friday, August 30, 13:30

Draw 3
Friday, August 30, 16:00

Draw 4
Friday, August 30, 19:00

Draw 5
Friday, August 30, 21:30

Draw 6
Saturday, August 31, 08:00

Draw 7
Saturday, August 31, 10:30

Draw 8
Saturday, August 31, 13:30

Draw 9
Saturday, August 31, 16:00

Draw 10
Saturday, August 31, 19:00

Draw 11
Saturday, August 31, 21:30

Draw 12
Sunday, September 1, 09:00

Draw 13
Sunday, September 1, 12:00

Draw 14
Sunday, September 1, 14:30

Playoffs

Source:

Qualification Games
Sunday, September 1, 18:00

Quarterfinals
Sunday, September 1, 21:30

Semifinals
Monday, September 2, 09:00

Final
Monday, September 2, 12:30

References

External links
Men's Event
Women's Event

2019 in Canadian curling
Curling in Ontario
August 2019 sports events in Canada
September 2019 sports events in Canada
2019 in Ontario
Oakville, Ontario